Palaka (or 'Kpalaga') is a central Senufo language spoken by approximately 8,000 people in northern Ivory Coast. It is bordered to the south by Djimini, a southern Senufo language, and to the west by Nyarafolo, another Senufo language. North and east of the Palaka area live Dioula people.

Palaka constitutes a separate branch of the Senufo languages on its own, being rather different from them in morphology and phonology. It has been tentatively linked to Nafaanra language, an isolated Senufo language spoken in Ghana. Palaka has been separated from the other Senufo languages at least since the fourteenth century AD.

References
Notes

Sources
 Laughren, Mary (1977) "Le 'nom' en palaka", Bulletin de l'Institut Francophone de l'Afrique Noire, série B, 557–567.

Senufo languages
Languages of Ivory Coast